The discography of American country music singer Ronnie Milsap consists of 30 albums and 79 singles. Since releasing his first album in 1971, Milsap has had 40 number-one hits on the Billboard country chart and sold over 35 million albums. In addition, 26 of his US number-one hits reached number-one on the RPM Top Country Tracks chart in Canada; three songs that did not reach number-one in the US were number one in Canada; and two of his US number-one country hits also topped the US adult contemporary chart. As of 2000, he has recorded 7 gold albums, 1 platinum album, and 1 double-platinum album.

Studio albums

1970s

1980s and 1990s

2000s and 2020s

Holiday albums

Live albums

Compilation albums

Singles

1960s and 1970s

1980s

1990s

2000s-2020s

As a featured artist

Promotional singles

Music videos

Notes

References

Country music discographies
Discographies of American artists